Thousand Palms or 1000 Palms may refer to;

 1000 Palms, an album by the rock band Surfer Blood
 Thousand Palms, California, a community in Riverside County
 Thousand Palms Oasis and Canyon, in Riverside County, California's Indio Hills